Sells Airport  is a public use non-towered airport owned by the Tohono O'odham Nation.

Although most U.S. airports use the same three-letter location identifier for the FAA, IATA, and ICAO, this airport is only assigned  E78 by the FAA.

Facilities and aircraft 
It has one asphalt runway:
 4/22 measuring 

For the 12-month period ending April 17, 2017, the airport had 260 aircraft operations, an average of 0.7 per day: 77% general aviation and 23% air taxi. At that time there were no aircraft based at this airport.

References

External links 
 

Airports in Pima County, Arizona
Tohono O'odham Nation